The 59393/59394 Dahod - Bhopal Fast Passenger is a passenger train of the Indian Railways connecting  in Gujarat and  in Madhya Pradesh. It is currently being operated with 59393/59394 train numbers on a daily basis.

Coach Composition

The train consists of 18 coaches:

 13 General Unreserved
 1 AC Seating
 1 Second Seating
 2 Seating cum Luggage Rake

Service

The 59393/Dahod - Bhopal Fast Passenger has average speed of 39 km/hr and covers 394 km in 10 hours 5 minutes with 48 stops on the route.

The 59394/Bhopal - Dahod Fast Passenger has average speed of 36 km/hr and covers 394 km in 11 hours 5 minutes with 48 stops on the route.

Schedule

Route 

Traction

Both trains are hauled by a Vadodara Loco Shed based WAP 5 or WAP 4E electric locomotives.

References

External links 

 59393/Dahod - Bhopal Fast Passenger
 59394/Bhopal - Dahod Fast Passenger

Transport in Dahod
Rail transport in Gujarat
Transport in Bhopal
Rail transport in Madhya Pradesh